Jesús Ángel Garza García (born 6 June 2000) is a Mexican professional footballer who plays as a midfielder for Liga MX club Tigres UANL.

Career statistics

Club

References

External links
 
 
 

2000 births
Living people
Association football midfielders
Liga MX players
Tigres UANL footballers
Footballers from Nuevo León
Sportspeople from Monterrey
Mexican footballers